Hena may refer to:
Hēna, a Sinhalese caste of washers
Hena, Iran, a village in Fars Province, Iran
Henna (Lawsonia inermis), a flowering plant, or the dye made from it
Erhu, a traditional Chinese musical instrument known as hena in Taiwan